Hargrove is an unincorporated community in Dunklin County, in the U.S. state of Missouri.

The community has the name of Bob Hargrove, a railroad official.

References

Unincorporated communities in Dunklin County, Missouri
Unincorporated communities in Missouri